John Moreland was a Scottish footballer who played in the Football League for Blackburn Rovers.

References

Date of birth unknown
Date of death unknown
English footballers
Association football forwards
English Football League players
Nelson F.C. players
Blackburn Rovers F.C. players